Mark C. Taylor (born January 26, 1958) is a Canadian former professional ice hockey player. Taylor played in the National Hockey League (NHL) for the Philadelphia Flyers, Pittsburgh Penguins, and Washington Capitals.

Career
Selected in the sixth round, 100th overall, of the 1978 NHL Entry Draft by the Philadelphia Flyers, Taylor played college hockey with the North Dakota Fighting Sioux from 1976 to 1980.

He is now co-owner of a popular chain of hockey equipment stores bearing his grandfather's name, Cyclone Taylor Sports, based in the Greater Vancouver area.

Personal life 
Taylor is the grandson of Hockey Hall of Famer Cyclone Taylor.

Awards and honours

References

External links
 
Profile at hockeydraftcentral.com

1958 births
Living people
AHCA Division I men's ice hockey All-Americans
Binghamton Whalers players
Bolzano HC players
Canadian ice hockey centres
ECD Sauderland players
Kamloops Chiefs players
Maine Mariners players
Philadelphia Flyers draft picks
Philadelphia Flyers players
Pittsburgh Penguins players
SC Herisau players
SC Rapperswil-Jona Lakers players
Ice hockey people from Vancouver
North Dakota Fighting Hawks men's ice hockey players
Washington Capitals players
NCAA men's ice hockey national champions